The Malaysian ringgit (plural: ringgit; symbol: RM; currency code: MYR; Malay name: Ringgit Malaysia; formerly the Malaysian dollar) is the currency of Malaysia. It is divided into 100 sen (formerly cents). The ringgit is issued by the Central Bank of Malaysia.

Etymology 

The word ringgit is an obsolete term for "jagged" in the Malay language. The word was originally used to refer to the serrated edges. The first European coins to circulate widely in the region were Spanish "pieces of eight" or "cob", their crude appearance resembling stones, hence the word jagged. The availability and circulation of this Spanish currency were due to the Spanish controlling nearby Philippines.

An early printed source, the Dictionary of the Malayan Language from 1812 had already referred to the ringgit as a unit of money.

In modern usage, ringgit is used almost solely for the currency. Due to the common heritage of the three modern currencies, the Singapore dollar and the Brunei dollar are also called ringgit in Malay (currencies such as the US and Australian dollars are translated as dolar), although nowadays the Singapore dollar is more commonly called dolar in Malay. To differentiate between the three currencies, the Malaysian currency is referred to as Ringgit Malaysia, hence the official abbreviation and currency symbol RM. Internationally, the ISO 4217 currency code for Malaysian ringgit is MYR.

The Malay names ringgit and sen were officially adopted as the sole official names in 28 August 1975. Previously they had been known officially as dollars and cents in English and ringgit and sen in Malay, and in some parts of the country this usage continues. In the northern states of Peninsular Malaysia, denominations of 10 sen are called kupang in Northern Malay and called pua̍t (鏺/鈸) in Penang Hokkien which is thought to be derived from the Thai word baht. e.g. 50 sen is lima kupang in Malay or 'samah' in the Kelantan dialect and gōo-pua̍t (五鏺/鈸) in Hokkien. The Tamil speaking communities in Malaysia use veḷḷi (வெள்ளி) meaning "silver" in Tamil to refer to ringgit, while for sen, the word kācu (காசு) is used, from which the English word "cash" is derived.

History

Before independence 

The Spanish-American silver dollar brought over by the Manila galleons was the primary currency for international trade, used in Asia and the Americas from the 16th to 19th centuries; it was eventually called the ringgit. The various dollars introduced in the 19th century were itself derived from the Spanish dollar: the Straits dollar, Sarawak dollar and the British North Borneo dollar. From these dollars were derived their successor currencies the Malayan dollar and the Malaya and British Borneo dollar, and eventually the modern-day Malaysian ringgit, Singapore dollar and Brunei dollar.

After independence (1967–1997) 

On 12 June 1967, the Malaysian dollar, issued by the new central bank, Central Bank of Malaysia, replaced the Malaya and British Borneo dollar at par. The new currency retained all denominations of its predecessor except the $10,000 denomination, and also brought over the colour schemes of the old dollar. Over the course of the following decades, minor changes were made to the notes and coins issued, from the introduction of the M$1 coin in 1967, to the demonetization of RM500 and RM1,000 notes in 1999.

As the Malaysian dollar replaced the Malaya and British Borneo dollar at par and Malaysia was a participating member of the sterling area, the new dollar was originally valued at  dollars per 1 British pound sterling; in turn, £1 = US$2.80 so that US$1 = M$3.06. In November 1967, five months after the introduction of the Malaysian dollar, the pound was devalued by 14.3% from US$2.80 to US$2.40, leading to a collapse in confidence for the sterling area and its demise in 1972. The new currency stayed pegged to the U.S. dollar at US$1 = M$3.06, but earlier notes of the Malaya and British Borneo dollar were devalued from US$2.80 to US$2.40 for 8.57 dollars; consequently these notes were reduced in value to 85 cents per dollar.

Despite the emergence of new currencies in Malaysia, Singapore and Brunei, the Interchangeability Agreement which the three countries adhered to as original members of the currency union meant the Malaysian dollar was exchangeable at par with the Singapore dollar and Brunei dollar. This ended on 8 May 1973, when the Malaysian government withdrew from the agreement. The Monetary Authority of Singapore and the Brunei Currency and Monetary Board still maintain the interchangeability of their two currencies, as of 2021.

In 1993, the currency symbol "RM" (Ringgit Malaysia) was introduced to replace the use of the dollar sign "$" (or "M$").

Asian financial crisis and US dollar currency peg (1997–2005) 

Between 1995 and 1997, the ringgit was trading as a free float currency at around 2.50 to the US dollar, but following the onset of the 1997 Asian financial crisis, the ringgit witnessed major dips to under 3.80 MYR/USD by the end of 1997 as a result of capital flight. During the first half of 1998, the currency fluctuated between 3.80 and 4.40 MYR/USD, before the Central Bank of Malaysia moved to peg the ringgit to the US dollar in September 1998, maintaining its 3.80 MYR/USD value while remaining floated against other currencies. In addition, the ringgit was designated non-tradeable outside of Malaysia in 1998 to stem the flow of money out of the country.

While the printing of RM500 and RM1,000 notes had ceased in 1996 in response to risks of money laundering and capital flight, the underestimated effects of the financial crisis prompted the central bank to completely discontinue the use of the notes by demonetising the remaining notes in circulation beginning 1 July 1999. The two denominations hereby ceased to be legal tender and were only exchangeable directly at the central bank; at the time of the demonetization, RM500 and RM1,000 notes were each worth approximately US$130 and US$260 respectably, based on the 3.80 MYR/USD peg rate. Despite these measures, some 7.6% of RM500 notes and 0.6% of RM1,000 notes remain in circulation as of 30 January 2011. During a 2011 parliamentary session, then Deputy Finance Minister Donald Lim Siang Chai asserted that a total of 150,599 and 26,018 pieces of RM500 and RM1,000 notes (RM75,299,500 worth of RM500 notes and RM26,018,000.00 worth of RM1,000 notes) have yet to be withdrawn through the central bank.

The ringgit lost 50% of its value against the US dollar between 1997 and 1998, and suffered general depreciation against other currencies between December 2001 and January 2005. As of 4 September 2008, the ringgit had yet to regain its value circa 2001 against the Singapore dollar (2.07 to 2.40 MYR/SGD), the euro (3.40 to 4.97 MYR/EUR), the Australian dollar (1.98 to 2.80 MYR/AUD), and the British pound (5.42 to 6.10 MYR/GBP).

On 21 July 2005, Central Bank of Malaysia announced the end of the peg to the US dollar immediately after China's announcement of the end of the renminbi peg to the US dollar. According to Bank Negara, Malaysia allows the ringgit to operate in a managed float against several major currencies. This has resulted in the value of the ringgit rising closer to its perceived market value, although Central Bank of Malaysia has intervened in financial markets to maintain stability in the trading level of the ringgit, a task made easier by the fact that the ringgit was pegged and has remained non-tradeable outside Malaysia since 1998.

Post-US dollar currency peg performance (2005–present) 
Following the end of the currency peg, the ringgit appreciated to as high as 3.16 MYR/USD in April 2008. The ringgit had also enjoyed a period of appreciation against the Hong Kong dollar (from 0.49 to 0.44 MYR/HKD) and the renminbi (0.46 to 0.45 MYR/CNY) as recently as May 2008. The initial stability of the ringgit in the late-2000s had led to considerations to reintroduce the currency to foreign trading after over a decade of being non-internationalised. In a CNBC interview in September 2010, Najib Tun Razak, the then Prime Minister and Finance Minister of Malaysia, was quoted in stating that the government was planning the reentry of the ringgit into off-shore trading if the move will help the economy, with the condition that rules and regulations were put in place to prevent abuses. Despite considerations, the ringgit has continued to remain non-internationalised in a deliberate move to continue discouraging off-shore trading of the currency.

Political uncertainty following the country's 2008 general election and the 2008 Permatang Pauh by-election, falling crude oil prices in the late-2000s, and the lack of intervention by the Central Bank of Malaysia to increase already low interest rates (which remained at 3.5% between April 2006 and November 2008) led to a slight fall of the ringgit's value against the US dollar between May and July 2008, followed by a sharper drop between August and September of the same year. As a result, the US dollar appreciated significantly to close at 3.43 MYR/USD as of 4 September 2008, while other major currencies, including the renminbi and Hong Kong dollar, followed suit. The ringgit spiked at 3.73 MYR/USD by March 2009, before gradually recovering to 3.00 MYR/USD by mid-2011 and normalising at around 3.10 MYR/USD between 2011 and 2014.

The ringgit experienced more acute plunges in the value since mid-2014 following the escalation of the 1Malaysia Development Berhad scandal that raised allegations of political channeling of billions of ringgit to off-shore accounts, and uncertainty from the 2015–16 Chinese stock market turbulence and the effects of the 2016 United States presidential election results. The currency's value fell from an average of 3.20 MYR/USD in mid-2014 to around 3.70 MYR/USD by early 2015; with China being Malaysia's largest trading partner, a Chinese stock market crash in June 2015 triggered another plunge in value for the ringgit, which reached levels unseen since 1998 at lows of 4.43 MYR/USD in September 2015, before stabilising around 4.10 to 4.20 to the US dollar soon after; the currency later plummeted and hover below the 1998 lows at 4.40 and 4.50 MYR/USD, following the wake of the victory of pro-protectionist Donald Trump in the 2016 United States presidential election, which has raised questions of the United States' participation in the Trans-Pacific Partnership (TPP) (which Malaysia is a signatory of, and the United States had promptly pulled out from in January 2017) and Malaysia–United States trade as a whole (as the United States is among Malaysia's largest trading partners).

In response to the sharp drop of the ringgit in November 2016, Central Bank of Malaysia began a series of tougher crackdowns on under-the-counter non-deliverable forward trading of the ringgit in order to curb currency speculation. Since then, the currency has seen a steady but consistent rate of appreciation against the US dollar, with significant increases since early-November 2017 following reports of positive economic performance, the restructuring of the TPP into the Comprehensive and Progressive Agreement for Trans-Pacific Partnership and increasing global oil prices. After appreciating as high as 3.86 to the US dollar as of early April 2018, the value dropped to around 4.18 MYR/USD by the end of October 2018 following increasing trade war tensions in response to the China–United States trade war, selloff panic from other emerging markets, as well as uncertainty in economic policy following an upset by the Pakatan Harapan coalition in the 2018 general election. With the exception of the Euro, the currency's has also seen some recovery of value to pre-late 2016 levels against other major currencies, including the renminbi, British pound, Australian dollar, Japanese yen and Singaporean dollar, but remains less valuable overall than before the end of 2013.

Historical exchange rates

Coinage

First series (1967) 
The first series of sen coins were introduced in 1967 in denominations of 1, 5, 10, 20 and 50 sen, followed by the introduction of the 1 ringgit coin (which used the $ symbol and is the largest coin in the series) in 1971. While varied by diameters, virtually all the coins were minted in near-consistent obverse and reverse designs and were very generic, with the obverse depicting the then recently completed Malaysian Houses of Parliament and the federal star and crescent moon from the canton of the Malaysian flag. All coins were minted from cupronickel, the only exception being the 1 sen coin, which was first composed from bronze between 1967 and 1972, then in steel clad with copper from 1973 onwards. The 50 sen coin is the only one in the series to undergo a redesign, a minor 1971 modification on its edge to include "Bank Negara Malaysia" letterings. All coins have the initials GC on the reverse, below the Parliament House. It stands for Geoffrey Colley, Malaysia first coin series' designer. The 1 ringgit coin was never popular at the time due to being in conflict with a banknote of equal face value, similar to the current situation regarding the 1 dollar coin of the United States dollar.

The coins of this first series were identical in size and composition to those of the former Malaya and British Borneo dollar. Though the Malayan currency union coins were withdrawn, they still appear in circulation on very rare occasions.

Minting of the first sen series ended in 1989, when the second series was introduced. The older coins remain legal tender as of 2019, but have steadily declined in number and are seldom seen in circulation in Malaysia.

Second series (1989) 
The second series of sen coins entered circulation in late 1989, sporting completely redesigned observes and reverses, but predominantly retaining the design of edges, diameters and composition of the previous series' coins previous to 1989, the 1 ringgit coin being the exception. Changes include the depiction of items of Malay culture on the obverse, such as a local mancala game board called congkak on the 10 sen and the wau bulan or "moon kite" on the 50 sen among other things, as well as the inclusion of a Hibiscus rosa-sinensis (Malay: Bunga Raya), the national flower of Malaysia, on the upper half of the reverse. The second series was designed by Low Yee Kheng.

In addition to changes on its observe and reverse, the size of the 1 ringgit coin was also reduced from a diameter of 33 mm to 24 mm, and was minted from an alloy of copper, zinc and tin, as opposed to the first series' cupronickel. The $ symbol was brought over to the new coin, but was dropped in favour of "RINGGIT" for coins minted from 1993 onwards. On 7 December 2005, the 1 ringgit coin was demonetised and withdrawn from circulation. This was partly due to problems with standardisation (two different versions of the second series coin were minted) and forgery.

As of 1 April 2008, a rounding mechanism of prices to the nearest 5 sen, applied to the total bill only, is in force, which was first announced in 2007 by Central Bank of Malaysia, in an attempt to render the 1 sen coin irrelevant. Individual items and services can still be priced in multiples of 1 sen with the final totalled rounded to the nearest 5 sen.  For example, purchasing two items priced RM4.88 and RM3.14, totalling RM8.02, would then be rounded to RM8.00. If each item had been individually rounded (to RM4.90 and RM3.15 respectively) the incorrect total would have been RM8.05.  In practice, individual items will probably remain priced at so-called "price points" (or psychological pricing and odd-number pricing) ending in 98 and 99 to maximise rounding gains for the vendor, especially in the case of single item purchases.  Existing 1 sen coins in circulation remain legal tender for payments up to RM2.00.

Third series (2012) 

The third series of coins were announced on 25 July 2011, first being issued as commemorative coins to mark their release on 16 January 2012. The third series carry a theme named "Distinctively Malaysia" and are inspired from motifs of flora and fauna drawn from various cultures in Malaysia to "reflect the diversity and richness of Malaysia's national identity". The denominations issued are 5, 10, 20 and 50 sen. On 24 October 2011, Deputy Finance Minister Datuk Donald Lim named Poogsan Corporation of South Korea as the series' coin suppliers and the coins are minted at the Bank Negara Mint in Shah Alam.

According to Lim, costs in producing the coins will be reduced by 49% due to the change in metal composition. Other changes in the series include the diameter, the colour on the 20- and 50 sen coins (from silver to yellow) and a redesign on the obverse (featuring different motifs for each denomination), fourteen dots symbolising the thirteen states and the collective Federal Territories, and five horizontal lines indicating the five principles of Rukunegara.

The 50-cent coin is more distinctive than the other denominations. The round shape of the coin has nine indentations, forgoing the original "BANK NEGARA MALAYSIA" lettering. The obverse does not feature the five horizontal lines, but instead a latent image security feature is placed over the coin, where lettering of the denomination "50" and "SEN" can be seen when the coin is tilted slightly.

The 20 sen and 50 sen coins look similar to €0.10 and €0.20 coin in size, edge design and colour, however they are only worth at €0.047 and €0.12 respectively.

Kijang Emas 

Three denominations of gold bullion coins, the "Kijang Emas" (the kijang, a species of deer, being part of Central Bank of Malaysia's logo) are also issued, at the face value of RM 50, RM 100 and RM 200, weighing  oz,  oz and 1 oz (Troy ounce), respectively. It is minted by the Kilang Wang Central Bank of Malaysia and was launched on 17 July 2001 by Central Bank of Malaysia, making Malaysia the twelfth country to issue its own gold bullion coins. Like other bullion coins issued around the world, the Kijang Emas is primarily used as an investment rather than in day-to-day circulation. The purchase and resale price of Kijang Emas is determined by the prevailing international gold market price. Current price of the Kijang Emas is rated at RM 8266 for 1oz, RM 4211 for  oz and RM 2144 for  oz (November 17, 2020).

Banknotes

First series (1967) 

Central Bank of Malaysia first issued Malaysian dollar banknotes on 6 June 1967 in $1, $5, $10, $50 and $100 denominations. The $1000 denomination was first issued on 2 September 1968. The first Malaysian banknotes carried the image of Tuanku Abdul Rahman, the first Yang di-Pertuan Agong of independent Malaya and bore the signature of Tun Ismail bin Mohamed Ali, the first Malaysian Governor of Central Bank of Malaysia. On 16 August 1972, Central Bank of Malaysia adopted official new spelling system of the national language, Bahasa Malaysia, into the printing of its currency notes while retaining the designs. The banknotes with new spellings are circulated alongside the old banknotes.

Second series (1982) 
The second series was issued with Malaysian traditional ornamental designs, with the introduction of two new denomination, the $20 and $500 in 1982; later followed by $10, $50 and $100 in 1983, finally the $1, $5 & $1000 completed this series in 1984. Until 2010 the second series notes was still occasionally encountered.

The mark for the blind on the upper left hand corner was removed on the second revision in 1986.

Due to its unpopularity, the $20 (RM20) denominations were discontinued and gradually removed from circulation in 1995.

In 1999 the RM500 and RM1000 notes were discontinued and ceased to be legal tender. This was due because of the Asian monetary crisis of 1997 when huge amounts of ringgit were taken out of the country to be traded in these notes. In effect the notes were withdrawn out of circulation and the amount of ringgit taken out of the country in banknotes was limited to RM1000.

In 1993, $1 notes were discontinued and replaced by the $1 coin.

Third series (1996) 

The third series was issued with designs in the spirit of Wawasan 2020 in 1996 in denominations of RM1, RM2, RM5, RM10, RM50 and RM100. The larger denomination RM50 and RM100 notes had an additional hologram strip to deter counterfeiters.

In 2004, Central Bank of Malaysia issued a new RM10 note with additional security features including the holographic strip previously only seen on the RM50 and RM100 notes. A new RM5 polymer banknote with a distinctive transparent window was also issued. Both new banknotes are almost identical to their original third series designs. At one time, Central Bank of Malaysia announced its intention to eventually phase out all paper notes and replace them with polymer notes.

Fourth series (2012) 
In early 2008, the Bank released a newly designed RM50 banknote, which according to the Bank, were to enter general circulation beginning 30 January 2008.  Earlier, 20,000 more such notes with special packaging were distributed by the bank on 26 December 2007.

The newly designed RM50 banknote retains the predominant colour of green-blue, but is designed in a new theme, dubbed the "National Mission", expressing the notion of Malaysia "[moving] the economy up the value chain", in accordance to Malaysia's economic transformation to higher value-added activities in agriculture, manufacturing and services sectors of the economy. The dominant intaglio portrait of the first Yang di-Pertuan Agong, Tuanku Abdul Rahman, is retained on the right and the national flower, the hibiscus, is presented in the center on the obverse of the note. Design patterns from songket weaving, which are in the background and edges of the banknote, are featured to reflect the traditional Malay textile handicraft and embroidery.

The first 50 million pieces of the new RM50 banknote features Malaysia's first Prime Minister, Tunku Abdul Rahman, at the historic declaration of Malaya's independence, and the logo of the 50th Anniversary of Independence on the reverse. Security features on the banknote include a watermarked portrait of the Yang di-Pertuan Agong, a security thread, micro letterings, fluorescent elements visible only under ultraviolet light, a multi coloured latent image which changes colour when viewed at different angles, and a holographic stripe at the side of the note and an image that is visible only via a moiré effect to prevent counterfeiting using photocopiers. Circulation for the first edition of this new RM50 banknote was eventually curtailed by the Central Bank due to the various Malaysia banks' automatic teller machines inability to accept it. The bank began to re-release the new series for general circulation beginning 15 July 2009 without the 50th Anniversary logo. This edition include new enhanced security features such as two color number fluorescents and security fibres.

In May 2011, Central Bank of Malaysia had announced that they will introduce a new series of banknotes to replace the current design that has been in circulation for around 15 years. The most highlighted part of the announcement is the re-introduction of the RM20 note, which was not included in the third series. The design of the new notes was announced on 21 December 2011, and the notes are expected to be put into circulation in the second half of 2012. The new series banknotes are legal tender and will co-circulate with the existing series. The existing series will be gradually phased out. All 4 series of banknotes (except 500, and 1000) are technically still legal tender, but some vendors may not accept the first and second series banknotes (rarely seen now). All banknote denominations in the new series will retain the portrait of the first Yang di-Pertuan Agong, Tuanku Abdul Rahman. The banknotes are supplied by Crane AB of Sweden, Giesecke & Devrient GmbH of Germany, Oberthur Technologies of France and Orell Fussli of Switzerland. They were put into circulation on 16 July 2012.

Commemorative banknotes

1998 Commonwealth Games
To commemorate the 1998 Commonwealth Games in Kuala Lumpur, a commemorative RM50 polymer banknote was issued on 1 June 1998. This was the first polymer banknote to be issued by Central Bank of Malaysia and was printed by Note Printing Australia (NPA). A total of 500,000 sets were issued. They were sold in special packaging and at a premium price of 80 ringgit. This note is hardly ever seen in normal usage, its use being a collector's commemorative.

50th Anniversary of Independence
On 21 December 2007, Central Bank of Malaysia issued a commemorative 50 ringgit banknote to commemorate Malaysia's 50th Anniversary of Independence. The design was that of the 50 ringgit banknote of the fourth series, except with the additional logo of the 50th Anniversary of Independence at the top right of the reverse side, and the inscription "1957-2007" also on the reverse side of the banknote. The regular 50 ringgit notes which were issued later from 2009 onward did not carry these additional design features

A total of 50 million banknotes which bore the commemorative design, with serial number letter prefixes from AA to AE, were issued. Subsequent regular banknotes had serial number prefixes from AF onward. Of the 50 million commemorative banknotes, the first 20,000 were sold with a special packaging at a premium price of 60 ringgit.

60th Anniversary of the Signing of the Federation of Malaya Independence Agreement
On 14 December, Central Bank of Malaysia announced the issue of two paper-polymer hybrid commemorative banknotes in conjunction with the sixtieth anniversary of the Signing of the Federation of Malaya Independence Agreement. The banknotes were in the denominations of 60 ringgit and 600 ringgit.  The 60 ringgit note was also made available in a 3-in-1 format.

The 600 ringgit note is the largest legal tender banknote in terms of size to be issued in the world, measuring 370mm by 220mm.

The notes were released for sale online on 29 December 2017 at a premium, with the 60 ringgit note sold at 120 ringgit, the 3-in-1 60 ringgit note at 500 ringgit and the 600 ringgit note at 1,700 ringgit. The print run for the 60 ringgit note was 60,000 while that for both the 3-in-1 60 ringgit and 600 ringgit note were at 6,000.

Summary of commemorative banknotes

See also 
 Economy of Malaysia

References

External links 
 Current Banknote Series – page listing current banknotes on the Central Bank of Malaysia website
 Historical banknotes of Malaysia

Circulating currencies
Currencies of Asia
Currencies of the Commonwealth of Nations
Currencies of Malaysia
Dollar
Currencies introduced in 1967
Currency symbols